24 Heures de la vie d'une femme is a 2002 film by Laurent Bouhnik, based on the novel 24 Stunden aus dem Leben einer Frau by Stefan Zweig.  The music is by Michael Nyman, and the accompanying soundtrack album is his 45th.

Cast
 Agnès Jaoui as Marie Collins Brown
 Michel Serrault as Louis
  as Young Louis
 Bérénice Bejo as Olivia
 Nikolaj Coster-Waldau as Anton
  as Herve
 Frances Barber as Betty
 Pascal Greggory as casino player
  as Henriette
 Serge Riaboukine as Maurice
 Chloé Lambert as boarder
 François Caron as blond boarder

Soundtrack

Track listing

Personnel
Michael Nyman Orchestra
Catherine Thompson, violin (leader)
Edward Coxon, violin
Dermot Crehan, violin
Beverley Davison, violin
Ian Humphries, violin
Philippa Ibbotson, violin
Patrick Kiernan, violin
Buguslav Kostecki, violin
Julian Leaper, violin
Perry Montague-Mason, violin
Everton Nelson, violin
Maciej Rakowski, violin
Sonia Slaney, violin
Phillip D'Arcy, viola
Catherine Musker, viola
Andrew Parker, viola
Bruce Roberts, viola
Rachel Roberts, viola
Sophie Harris, cello
Anthony Hinnigan, cello
William Schofield, cello
David Roach, soprano, alto sax
Simon Haram, soprano, alto sax
Andrew Findon, alto flute, flute, piccolo, baritone sax
David Lee, horn
Nigel Gomm, trumpet
Nigel Barr, bass trombone, euphonium
Martin Elliott, bass guitar
Chris Laurence, double bass
Michael Nyman, piano, conductor
Composed and conducted by Michael Nyman
Orchestrated by Gary Carpenter
Music consultant: Eduard Dubois
Orchestral contractor: Isobel Griffiths
Engineer: Austin Ince
Assistant engineers: Paul Richardson, Tom Hanan
Mastered By Bob Whitney
Mixed By Austin Ince, Michael Nyman, Snake Ranch, London, December 2002
Mastered by Bob Whitney at Sony Music Studios, London, December 2002
Executive producer: Elizabeth Lloyd
Production coordinator: Sarah Morley
Special thanks:  Claude Duvivier, Matthew Freeman, Michael Connell, Emmanuelle Mérand
Published by Chester Music Limited/Michael Nyman Limited 2002
Photography: Martial Lorcet
Michael Nyman photograph:  James Mollison

References

External links

2002 films
Films based on works by Stefan Zweig
2000s French-language films
2002 drama films
Films shot in Cologne
Films directed by Laurent Bouhnik
Films scored by Michael Nyman
French drama films
2000s French films